In statistical theory, the Pitman closeness criterion, named after E. J. G. Pitman, is a way of comparing two candidate estimators for the same parameter. Under this criterion, estimator A is preferred to estimator B if the probability that estimator A is closer to the true value than estimator B is greater than one half. Here the meaning of closer is determined by the absolute difference in the case of a scalar parameter, or by the Mahalanobis distance for a vector parameter.

References

Pitman, E. (1937) "The “closest” estimates of statistical parameters". Mathematical Proceedings of the Cambridge Philosophical Society, 33 (2), 212–222. 
Rukhin, A.  (1996) "On the Pitman closeness criterion from the decision – Theoretic point of view". Statistics & Decisions, 14, 253–274.
Peddada, D. S. (1985) "A short note on Pitman’s measure of nearness". American Statistician, 39, 298–299.
Peddada, D. S. (1986) "Reply". American Statistician, 40, 2576
Nayak, T. K. (1990) "Estimation of location and scale parameters using generalized Pitman nearness criterion". Journal of Statistical Planning and Inference, 24, 259–268. 
Nayak, T. K. (1994) "Pitman nearness comparison of some estimators of population variance", American Statistician 48, 99–102.
Nayak, T. K. (1998) "On equivariant estimation of the location of elliptical distributions under Pitman closeness criterion", Statistics and Probability Letters 36, 373–378.
Fountain, R. L. (1991) "Pitman closeness comparison of linear estimators: A canonical form", Commun. Statist.–Theory Meth., 20 (11), 3535–3550.
Ghosh, M.; Sen, P. K. (1989) Median unbiasedness and Pitman closeness. Journal of the American Statistical Association, 84, 1089–1091.
Johnson, N. L. (1950) "On the comparison of estimators", Biometrika, 37, 281–287. 
Keating, J. P.; Gupta, R. C. (1984) "Simultaneous comparison of scale estimators". Sankhya, Ser. B 46, 275–280. 
Keating, J. P.; Mason, R. L.; Sen, P. K. (1993) Pitman’s Measure of Closeness: A Comparison of Statistical Estimators, SIAM, Philadelphia.  
Kubokawa, T. (1991) "Equivariant estimation under the Pitman closeness criterion". Commun. Statist.–Theory Meth., 20 (11), 3499–3523. 
Lee,  C. (1990) "On the characterization of Pitman’s measure of nearness". Statistics and Probability Letters, 8, 41–46.
Robert, Christian P.; Hwang, J. T. Gene; Strawderman, William E. (1993) "Is Pitman Closeness a Reasonable Criterion?", Journal of the American Statistical Association, 57–63  
Blyth, C. R. (1993) "Is Pitman Closeness a Reasonable Criterion?: Comment", Journal of the American Statistical Association, 88 421), 72–74.
Casella, G. ; Wells, M. T. (1993) "Is Pitman Closeness a Reasonable Criterion?: Comment", Journal of the American Statistical Association, 70–71.
Ghosh, M., Keating, J. P. and Sen, P. K. (1993) "Is Pitman Closeness a Reasonable Criterion?: Comment", Journal of the American Statistical Association, 88, 63–66.
Peddada, S. D. (1993) "Is Pitman Closeness a Reasonable Criterion?: Comment", Journal of the American Statistical Association,  88, 67–69.
Rao, C. R. (1993) "Is Pitman Closeness a Reasonable Criterion?: Comment", Journal of the American Statistical Association, 88, 69–70.

Statistical distance
Point estimation performance